John Paul II High School in Tarnów is a general education liceum (high school) in Tarnów, Poland. The school was established in 1945.

Headteachers
 Janina Dembowska 1945-1946
 Jan Grela 1946-1950
 Jan Padlewski 1950-1951
 Aureliusz Dziunikowski 1951-1970
 Barbara Słowik 1969-1970
 Czesław Sterkowicz 1970-1990
 Anna Skórska 1990
 Władysław Węgiel 1990-2007
 Marek Smoła 2007-2017
 Anetta Święch 2017-

Notable graduates
 Michał Heller

References
 Official website
 Czesław Sterkowicz: IV Liceum Ogólnokształcące im. Stanisława Anioła w Tarnowie, Tarnów 1975
 Feliks Kiryk i Zygmunt Ruta (ed.): Tarnów. Dzieje miasta i regionu. Tom III - lata drugiej wojny światowej i okupacji hitlerowskiej oraz Polski Ludowej, Tarnów 1987
 Maria Gazda (ed.): IV Liceum Ogólnokształcące im. Stanisława Anioła w Tarnowie. 50-lecie 1945-1995, Tarnów 1995
 
 Marek Smoła: IV Liceum Ogólnokształcące im. Stanisława Anioła w Tarnowie 1945-2005: Szkoła i ludzie: zarys monograficzny, IV LO i Gimnazjum nr 10 w Tarnowie-Mościcach, Tarnów 2005, 
 
 

1945 establishments in Poland
Educational institutions established in 1945
High schools in Poland
Tarnów
Pope John Paul II